The End of Andrew Harrison is a 1938 detective novel by Freeman Wills Crofts. It is the seventeenth in his series of novels featuring Inspector French, a Scotland Yard detective  of the Golden Age known for his methodical technique. The title character closely resembles Sigsbee Manderson, the murder victim of E.C. Bentley's celebrated 1913 novel Trent's Last Case.

Synopsis
Few are prepared to shed a tear about the death of the ruthless financier Andrew Harrison aboard his houseboat at Henley. However the initial conclusion of suicide fails to convince French, who investigates and searches for the hidden link for what he believes is a case of murder.

References

Bibliography
 Evans, Curtis. Masters of the "Humdrum" Mystery: Cecil John Charles Street, Freeman Wills Crofts, Alfred Walter Stewart and the British Detective Novel, 1920-1961. McFarland, 2014.
 Herbert, Rosemary. Whodunit?: A Who's Who in Crime & Mystery Writing. Oxford University Press, 2003.
 Reilly, John M. Twentieth Century Crime & Mystery Writers. Springer, 2015.

1938 British novels
Novels by Freeman Wills Crofts
British crime novels
British mystery novels
British thriller novels
British detective novels
Hodder & Stoughton books
Novels set in London
Novels set in Oxfordshire
Irish mystery novels
Irish crime novels